Shaykh Mustafa Takhtayi or Shaikh Mostafa Takhti was Kurdish poet from Avroman Takht who lived before 1788. His works are among the earliest samples of written Gorani school of poetry. Takhtî was the father of poet Sheikh Ahmad Takhti who was born in around 1640.

References 
 
Kurdish poets

People from Kurdistan Province